USS Courier (AMc-72) was an Accentor-class coastal minesweeper acquired by the U.S. Navy for the dangerous task of removing mines from minefields laid in the water to prevent ships from passing.

World War II service 
Courier served in an "in service" status in the 1st Naval District from 1941 to 1946.

Post-war inactivation 
It was sold in 1946.

References

External links 
 

 

Accentor-class minesweepers
World War II mine warfare vessels of the United States
1941 ships